Leroy Denver Watson  (born 6 July 1966 in Broseley, Shropshire, Great Britain) is a British archer who was a member of the British squad that won the team bronze medals at the 1988 Summer Olympics. He also competed in the individual event, finishing in 18th place.

References

 Olympic profile

1966 births
Living people
People from Broseley
British male archers
Olympic archers of Great Britain
Archers at the 1988 Summer Olympics
Olympic bronze medallists for Great Britain
Olympic medalists in archery
Medalists at the 1988 Summer Olympics